Anisul Hakim (born 24 September 1975) better known as Anis is a first class cricketer who played for Chittagong Division from 2001/02 to 2003/04. A steady right-handed batsman, he scored 3 centuries in his 22 first class matches, with a best of 118 against Khulna Division. His occasional off breaks were rarely called upon. He was less successful in his 13 list A one-day matches, with his top score of 45 coming against Sylhet Division.

See also
 List of Chittagong Division cricketers

References

Bangladeshi cricketers
Chittagong Division cricketers
Living people
1975 births